is an interchange passenger railway station in located in the city of Yokkaichi, Mie, Japan. It is operated jointly by the private railway operators Kintetsu Railway and Sangi Railway.

Lines
Kintetsu-Tomida Station is a station on the Kintetsu Nagoya Line, and is located 31.6 rail kilometers from the terminus of the line at Kintetsu Nagoya Station. It is also a terminus for the Sangi Railway's Sangi Line and is 26.6 kilometers from the opposing terminus of that line at Nishi-Fujiwara Station

Station layout
The station consists of one side platform and one island platform.

Platforms

Adjacent stations

History
The Ise Railway became the Sangu Express Electric Railway’s Ise Line on September 15, 1936. The line was renamed the Nagoya Line on December 7, 1938. After merging with Osaka Electric Kido on March 15, 1941, the line became the Kansai Express Railway's Nagoya Line and the station was renamed . The Kansai Express was merged with the Nankai Electric Railway on June 1, 1944 to form Kintetsu, with the station becoming  The station was renamed to its present name on March 1, 1970. The Sangi Railway began operations at this station on June 25, 1970.

Passenger statistics
In fiscal 2019, the Kintetsu station was used by an average of 9,722 passengers daily (boarding passengers only). During the same period, the Sangi Railway portion of the station was used by 3,549 passengers daily

Surrounding area
Yokkaichi City Tomida District Civic Center
Yokkaichi Tomita Nishi Post Office
Mie Prefectural Yokkaichi Senior High School
Mie Prefectural Hokusei High School
Yokkaichi City Tomida Elementary School

See also
List of railway stations in Japan

References

External links

 Kintetsu: Tomida Station 

Railway stations in Japan opened in 1929
Railway stations in Mie Prefecture
Stations of Kintetsu Railway
Yokkaichi